Brian Dale Warner (born 1952) is an American amateur astronomer and computer programmer. In 2006 he was awarded the inaugural Chambliss Amateur Achievement Award by the American Astronomical Society. 

From the 1990s to 2011 Warner operated from the Palmer Divide Observatory at his home near Colorado Springs, Colorado. Since 2011 he has operated from the Palmer Divide Station  at the Center for Solar System Studies in Landers, California.

Warner's astronomy has included extensive use of photometry to record the light curves of asteroids and variable stars. His identification of five pairs of binary asteroids in the main belt contributed to the abandonment of the theory that binary asteroids only form through tidal interactions with planets. He discovered the asteroids 70030 Margaretmiller, 34366 Rosavestal and 34398 Terryschmidt.

Warner is the developer of the Minor Planet Observer (MPO) suite of astronomy software used for photometry observations of asteroids and variable stars. He also authored the 2006 book A Practical Guide to Lightcurve Photometry and Analysis, published by Springer, on using photometry to study asteroids and variable stars.

Warner studied undergraduate physics at the University of Colorado. In 2005 was awarded a masters degree in astronomy from James Cook University in Queensland, Australia.  

Books

References 

Living people
1952 births
Amateur astronomers
American astronomers
American computer programmers
Discoverers of minor planets
University of Colorado alumni
James Cook University alumni